Ganoderma meredithiae is a species of bracket fungus in the family Ganodermataceae. Described as new to science in 1988 by mycologists James E. Adaskaveg and Robert Lee Gilbertson, it is found in the southeastern United States in the Gulf Coast region from east Texas to Georgia. The fungus causes white rot and butt rot on living pines, including loblolly pine (Pinus taeda) and spruce pine (Pinus glabra). The holotype was collected in 1985 near Pineville, Louisiana. G. meredithiae is named in honor of mycologist Meredith Blackwell.

The complete mitochondrial genome of G. meredithiae was published in 2015.

References

Fungi described in 1988
Fungi of the United States
Fungal plant pathogens and diseases
Ganodermataceae
Fungi without expected TNC conservation status